Chuyka (Şuy) is a rural locality (a selo) in Turochaksky District, the Altai Republic, Russia. The population was 78 as of 2016. There are 3 streets.

Geography 
Chuyka is located 66 km southeast of Turochak (the district's administrative centre) by road. Tuloy and Verkh-Biysk are the nearest rural localities.

References 

Rural localities in Turochaksky District